John III, Margrave of Brandenburg-Salzwedel, nicknamed John from Prague (1244 in Prague – 1268) was the eldest son of Margrave Otto III and his wife, Beatrice of Bohemia.

After his father died in 1267, he ruled the Margraviate of Brandenburg jointly with his brother Otto V and his cousins Otto IV and Henry I.

John died during a tournament in 1268.  He was unmarried and childless.

House of Ascania
Margraves of Brandenburg
1244 births
1268 deaths
13th-century German nobility